The Katoomba Post Office is a heritage-listed former post office and now retail building at 59-61 Katoomba Street, Katoomba, City of Blue Mountains, New South Wales, Australia. It was designed by NSW Government Architect's office. It is also known as Katoomba Post Office (former). It was added to the New South Wales State Heritage Register on 22 December 2000.

Description 
Parapet wall to ends; two storey face brickwork; lower level base of face brickwork with upper and pilasters; face brickwork chimneys with terracotta chimney pots; multi-paned double hung timber windows.

Condition 
As at 26 October 2000, the condition of the post office was good.

Modifications and dates 
1917 - Alterations
1923 - Addition of second storey

Heritage listing 
As at 26 October 2000, historically and socially significant as a Post Office closely associated with the commercial centre of Katoomba and communications within the region. As an individual building the Post Office makes a strong contribution to the character of the Katoomba Street commercial shop group and streetscape.

Significant in demonstrating the transfer of control of Post Offices from State to Commonwealth. The NSW Government continued to design and build Post Offices until 1916 after which the Commonwealth took control. The Georgian Revival style of the state-built Katoomba Post Office (1910) was used as a model for a large series of new Post Offices built up to 1930 by the Commonwealth Department of Works and Railways.

Katoomba Post Office was listed on the New South Wales State Heritage Register on 22 December 2000.

See also 

Australian non-residential architectural styles
List of post offices in New South Wales

References

Bibliography

Attribution 

New South Wales State Heritage Register
Katoomba, New South Wales
Post office buildings in New South Wales
Retail buildings in New South Wales
Articles incorporating text from the New South Wales State Heritage Register
Government buildings completed in 1910
1910 establishments in Australia
Georgian Revival architecture in Australia
Buildings and structures in the Blue Mountains (New South Wales)